School Spirit is a 1985 American comedy film about a college student who is killed in a car accident and returns as a ghost to haunt his school. The film was directed by Alan Holleb, and stars Tom Nolan, Roberta Collins, and Larry Linville.

It was one of the first films from Roger Corman's new distribution company, Concorde Pictures, along with films like Barbarian Queen, Loose Screws, Cocaine Wars, and Wheels of Fire. Corman said he had to form his own distribution company because the owners of New World Pictures — which he sold — refused to distribute this and Wheels of Fire.

Cast

Tom Nolan as Billy Batson
Danièle Arnaud as Madeleine
Elizabeth Foxx as Judith Hightower
John Finnegan as Pinky Batson
Larry Linville as President Grimshaw
Roberta Collins as Helen Grimshaw
Marta Kober as Ursula Grimshaw
Nick Segal as Gregg
Frank Mugavero as Lasky
Toni Hudson as Rita

Production
The film was based on an idea of Geoffrey Bare called College Ghost about a campus Casanova who comes back as a ghost to help a nerd get laid. He pitched it unsuccessfully, but director Allan Holleb felt it had possibilities. They adjusted the script and ended up selling it to Roger Corman, who had worked with Holleb on Candy Stripe Nurses. Corman agreed to help make the film.

Holleb says one of his inspirations was the Italian film Il Sorpasso (1962).

Some of the finance came from a consortium of Indian doctors. It had been arranged by Ashok Amritraj, who became a successful producer.

Scenes at college were filmed at a veterans' hospital in Brentwood.

The special effects were done in the style of old Topper movies due to the low budget.

Reception
The Philadelphia Daily News called it "an affably low-rent soft-core item that dares to tackle such compelling subjects as life, death, mortality, morality and overaged schoolgirls who like to flex their mammary glands."

The Los Angeles Times called it a "vulgar, ugly looking little film of no visual distinction or ambition."

The Philadelphia Inquirer critic wrote, "By my count, there are 37 naked female breasts in the movie... (one aspiring actress appears only in profile; she must have a bad agent). I mention this because there's really no other reason for the movie to exist. There are no hot sex scenes, no terrific new jokes, no remotely funny performances. Just jiggle, jiggle, jiggle... a cheapo, one-gimmick teen sex comedy that's so thin and so exploitative that it couldn't even interest a minor distribution company."

See also
 List of ghost films

References

Notes

External links
 
 
 Review of film at Film School Rejects

1985 films
1985 comedy films
1980s ghost films
1980s sex comedy films
1980s teen comedy films
American ghost films
American sex comedy films
American teen comedy films
1980s English-language films
Teen sex comedy films
1980s American films